Susel Ana María Paredes Piqué (born 26 July 1963) is a Peruvian lawyer, LGBT rights activist and politician. She was elected to the Congress of the Republic of Peru for the 2021-2026 term.

Early life and education
Paredes was born in Lima on 26 July 1963. She studied at the Colegio Mater Purissima in the city of Lima. She studied law at the National University of San Marcos, in which she received the professional title of lawyer. She completed a master's degree in comparative law at the Complutense University of Madrid and completed her doctorate studies in law at the same university. She also completed a master's degree in Amazon studies at the National University of San Marcos. 

On the other hand, she studied at the TUC (Catholic University Theater School). Later, she was part of the cast of the telenovelas Carmín (PANTEL) and Los de arriba y los de bajo (ATV). And from the movie Todos somos estrellas. 

She was a professor at the Marcelino Champagnat University.

Activism and political career
Paredes has carried out various social aid activities in different areas of Peru, focusing on the human rights of people from less favored sectors. Likewise, she carries out activities in favor of the environment, women's rights, and gay rights. She has been a lawyer for the Flora Tristán Peruvian Women's Center and a consultant for Oxfam America. She is the founder of the LGBT Legal Civil Association, an association of homosexual lawyers.

Paredes was a member of the Socialist Party from 2004 to 2007, where she was a member of the Women's Committee. She ran for the Congress in the 2006 general elections, without obtaining a seat despite obtaining the second-highest vote for a candidate from her party in the country. She was elected as General Secretary of the Socialist Party on 2 March 2008. However, after several internal tensions, on 23 September 2009, she resigned with a sector of the said political group to form the Socialist Action Movement (MAS), which later joined the Land and Dignity party led by environmental activist Marco Arana.

Paredes supported the candidacy of Susana Villarán who successfully ran for mayor of Lima in the 2010 Lima municipal elections. During Villarán's management, Paredes was Manager of Inspection and Control in the Metropolitan Municipality of Lima until the end of 2014. She ran for Congress in the 2011 general elections for the Decentralist Social Force Party, but the party did not gain the required votes. For the 2014 Lima municipal elections, she was the Spokesperson for the Neighborhood Dialogue, a political group for which Villarán ran for reelection. From 2016 to 2017, Paredes was an advisor to the Safe Neighborhood program of the Ministry of the Interior. 

In 2019, Paredes assumed the Supervision Management in La Victoria District, forming part of Mayor George Forsyth's team. She resigned at the end of 2019 and, subsequently, assumed a similar position in the Magdalena del Mar District under the command of mayor Carlomagno Chacón, who had defeated her in the 2018 Lima municipal election. In 2020, in preparation for the 2021 general elections, Paredes announced she had joined the Purple Party as part of an agreement between this party and Citizen Force, which did not have registration.

Personal life
Paredes is openly lesbian, which she publicly announced to the Peruvian press in 2006. In 2016, she married her partner, Gracia María Aljovín in Miami under US marital law because it was not legal in her country.

References

1963 births
Living people
Peruvian women lawyers
Politicians from Lima
Peruvian LGBT politicians
Lesbian politicians
Women members of the Congress of the Republic of Peru
21st-century Peruvian politicians
21st-century Peruvian women politicians
National University of San Marcos alumni
Complutense University of Madrid alumni
LGBT legislators
20th-century Peruvian lawyers
21st-century Peruvian lawyers